Rafael de Souza Pereira (18 June 1989), known as Rafael Carioca, is a Brazilian professional footballer who plays as a defensive midfielder for Liga MX club Tigres UANL.

Club career

Grêmio
Born in Rio de Janeiro, Rafael Carioca joined Grêmio's youth setup in 2006, from Profute. Promoted to the first team after captaining the under-20 side in the 2008 Copa São Paulo de Futebol Júnior by Vágner Mancini, he was subsequently relegated back to the youth sides, as the manager complained about his attitude.

Promoted back to the main squad in March 2008 by new manager Celso Roth, Rafael Carioca made his first team debut on 26 March, coming on as a substitute for Nunes in a 4–1 Campeonato Gaúcho away routing of 15 de Novembro. He made his Série A debut on 10 May, starting in a 1–0 away win against São Paulo, and finished the campaign as a first-choice in the central midfield, creating a strong partnership with William Magrão and appearing in 34 matches.

Spartak Moscow
In December 2008, Rafael Carioca joined Russian club FC Spartak Moscow on a five-year contract. He made his debut abroad on 15 March, starting in a 1–1 home draw against FC Zenit Saint Petersburg.

Rafael Carioca spent the 2010 season on loan at Vasco da Gama, being an undisputed starter. Upon returning, he also became a first-choice, and scored his first professional goal on 6 May 2012, netting the winner in a 3–2 away defeat of Zenit.

Atlético Mineiro
On 13 August 2014, Rafael Carioca returned to his home country after being presented at Atlético Mineiro, agreeing to a year-long loan deal. Upon arriving, he became a first-choice player in Atlético's team that went on to win that year's Copa do Brasil, overcoming longtime incumbent .

Rafael Carioca had a solid start in the following season, which included an impressive goal against Colo-Colo in the Copa Libertadores and a Campeonato Mineiro win, again as a part of the team's starting eleven. On 21 July 2015, Atlético bought 50% of Rafael Carioca's federative rights, agreeing to a permanent four-year deal.

Tigres UANL
On 25 August 2017, Rafael Carioca joined Liga MX club Tigres UANL. In his first season, he played the historical final against rivals C.F. Monterrey. In the first leg the teams tied by 1–1 at the Estadio Universitario. In the Estadio BBVA Bancomer, Tigres beat Monterrey by 2–1 with goals of Edu Vargas and Francisco Meza, as Rafael Carioca played a key role by assisting Meza with a cross from the right wing to score the second goal. He can sometimes be aggressive towards others whenever he is pushed on purpose.

International career
In 2007, Rafael Carioca captained the Brazil under-20 side and featured in the Sendai Cup for the under-18s in the same year, but was an unused substitute in the tournament. He received his first international call-up for the senior squad on 22 August 2016, for matches against Ecuador and Colombia.

Career statistics

Honours

Atlético Mineiro
Copa do Brasil: 2014
Campeonato Mineiro: 2015, 2017

UANL
Liga MX: Apertura 2017, Clausura 2019
Campeón de Campeones: 2018
CONCACAF Champions League: 2020
Campeones Cup: 2018

Individual
Campeonato Brasileiro Série A Team of the Year: 2015
CONCACAF Champions League Team of the Tournament: 2019

References

External links

1989 births
Living people
Footballers from Rio de Janeiro (city)
Brazilian footballers
Association football midfielders
Campeonato Brasileiro Série A players
Grêmio Foot-Ball Porto Alegrense players
CR Vasco da Gama players
Clube Atlético Mineiro players
Russian Premier League players
FC Spartak Moscow players
Liga MX players
Tigres UANL footballers
Brazilian expatriate footballers
Brazilian expatriate sportspeople in Russia
Brazilian expatriates in Mexico
Expatriate footballers in Russia
Expatriate footballers in Mexico